The 2015 season was Club de Regatas Vasco da Gama's 117th year in existence, the club's 100th season in existence of football, and the club's 43rd season playing in the Brasileirão Série A, the top flight of Brazilian football.

Players

Current squad

Reserve squad (Vasco da Gama B)

Youth players who are able to play in first team

Out of loan

Squad information 
As of 15 November 2015.

from Vasco da Gama – (B) (reserve team) 
As of 15 November 2015.

Vasco da Gama – (U–20) 
As of 25 August 2015.

Transfers

In

Loan in

On trial (in)

Out

Loan out

On trial (out)

Club

Direction

Council

Football Committee

Match results

Pre-season

SuperSeries Tournament

Squad

Table

Overall

Matches

Rio de Janeiro State Championship

Squad 
The initial report was released on 27 January. The teams involved in the tournament are required to register a squad of a maximum 31 players in total, including 3 goalkeepers.

Notes

Guanabara Cup

Standings

Matches

Super Clássicos Tournament

Standings

Final stage

Matches

Semifinals

Final

Copa do Brasil

Matches

First stage

Second stage

Third round

Round of 16

Quarterfinals

Brasileirão Série A

Standings

Matches

Statistics

Appearances and goals 
Last updated on 6 December 2015.
Players in italics have left the club during the season.

|-
! colspan=14 style=background:#dcdcdc; text-align:center|Goalkeepers

|-
! colspan=14 style=background:#dcdcdc; text-align:center|Defenders

|-
! colspan=14 style=background:#dcdcdc; text-align:center|Midfielders

|-
! colspan=14 style=background:#dcdcdc; text-align:center|Forwards

|-
! colspan=14 style=background:#dcdcdc; text-align:center| Players of second squads who have made an appearance or had a squad number this season 

|-
! colspan=14 style=background:#dcdcdc; text-align:center| Players of youth squads who have made an appearance or had a squad number this season 

|-
! colspan=14 style=background:#dcdcdc; text-align:center| Players who have made an appearance or had a squad number this season but have transferred or loaned out during the season

|-
|}

Notes

Goalkeeper statistics 
{| border="1" cellpadding="4" cellspacing="0" style="margin: 1em 1em 1em 1em 0; background: #f9f9f9; border: 1px #aaa solid; border-collapse: collapse; font-size: 95%; text-align: center;"
|-
| rowspan="2" style="width:1%; text-align:center;"  |No.
| rowspan="2" style="width:70px; text-align:center;"|Nat.
| rowspan="2" style="width:40.5%; text-align:center;" |Player
| colspan="3" style="text-align:center;"|Total
| colspan="3" style="text-align:center;"|Brasileirão Série A
| colspan="3" style="text-align:center;"|Copa do Brasil
| colspan="3" style="text-align:center;"|Rio de Janeiro State Championship
|-
|PLD
|GA
|GAA
|PLD
|GA
|GAA
|PLD
|GA
|GAA
|PLD
|GA
|GAA
|-
| style="text-align: right;" |
|
| style="text-align: left;" |Charles
|8+1
|16
|1.77
|8+1
|16
|1.77
|
|
|
|
|
|
|-
| style="text-align: right;" |
|
| style="text-align: left;" |Jordi
|14+1
|23
|1.53
|9+1
|18
|1.80
|3
|4
|1.33
|2
|2
|1.00
|-
| style="text-align: right;" |
|
| style="text-align: left;" |Martín Silva
|45
|39
|0.86
|21
|20
|0.95
|7
|8
|1.14
|17
|11
|0.64
|-
| style="text-align: right;" |
|
| style="text-align: left;" |Alessandro
|
|
|
|
|
|
|
|
|
|
|
|
|-
| style="text-align: right;" |
|
| style="text-align: left;" |Diogo Silva
|
|
|
|
|
|
|
|
|
|
|
|
|-
| style="text-align: right;" |
|
| style="text-align: left;" |Rafael Copetti
|
|
|
|
|
|
|
|
|
|
|
|

Italic: denotes player is no longer with team

Top scorers 
{| class="wikitable" style="font-size: 95%; text-align: center;"
|-
!width=15 style="background:#000000; color:white; text-align:center;"|
!width=15 style="background:#000000; color:white; text-align:center;"|
!width=15 style="background:#000000; color:white; text-align:center;"|
!width=15 style="background:#000000; color:white; text-align:center;"|
!width=226 style="background:#000000; color:white; text-align:center;"|Name
!width=130 style="background:#000000; color:white; text-align:center;"|Brasileirão Série A
!width=110 style="background:#000000; color:white; text-align:center;"|Copa do Brasil
!width=150 style="background:#000000; color:white; text-align:center;"|Rio de Janeiro State Championship
!width=80 style="background:#000000; color:white; text-align:center;"|Total
|-
|1
|
|FW
|
|Rafael Silva
|3
|2
|5
|10
|-
|rowspan=2|2
|
|FW
|
|Gilberto
|
|
|9
|9
|-
|
|FW
|
|Nenê
|9
|
|
|9
|-
|rowspan=2|4
|
|DF
|
|Rodrigo
|4
|1
|2
|7
|-
|
|FW
|
|Duvier Riascos
|4
|3
|
|7
|-
|6
|
|DF
|
|Luan
|
|
|4
|4
|-
|rowspan=5|7
|
|DF
|
|Anderson Salles
|
|1
|2
|3
|-
|
|MF
|
|Bernardo
|
|
|3
|3
|-
|
|MF
|
|Lucas
|1
|
|2
|3
|-
|
|MF
|
|Marcinho
|
|
|3
|3
|-
|
|FW
|
|Thalles
|
|3
|
|3
|-
|rowspan=3|12
|
|DF
|
|Júlio César
|2
|
|
|2
|-
|
|MF
|
|Emanuel Biancucchi
|1
|1
|
|2
|-
|
|MF
|
|Jhon Cley
|1
|
|1
|2
|-
|rowspan=11|15
|
|DF
|
|Douglas Silva
|
|1
|
|1
|-
|
|DF
|
|Rafael Vaz
|1
|
|
|1
|-
|
|MF
|
|Andrezinho
|1
|
|
|1
|-
|
|MF
|
|Santiago Montoya
|
|
|1
|1
|-
|
|MF
|
|Serginho
|
|
|1
|1
|-
|
|FW
|
|Dagoberto
|
|
|1
|1
|-
|
|FW
|
|Germán Herrera
|
|1
|
|1
|-
|
|FW
|
|Jorge Henrique
|
|1
|
|1
|-
|
|FW
|
|Leandrão
|1
|
|
|1
|-
|
|FW
|
|Yago
|
|1
|
|1
|-
|
|
|
|
|
|
|1
|1
|-
|colspan="4"|
! style="background:#000000; color:white; text-align:center;"|TOTALS
! style="background:#000000; color:white; text-align:center;"|28
! style="background:#000000; color:white; text-align:center;"|15
! style="background:#000000; color:white; text-align:center;"|35
! style="background:#000000; color:white; text-align:center;"|78

Those in italics are no longer with club.

Top assistants 
{| class="wikitable" style="font-size: 95%; text-align: center;"
|-
!width=15 style="background:#000000; color:white; text-align:center;"|
!width=15 style="background:#000000; color:white; text-align:center;"|
!width=15 style="background:#000000; color:white; text-align:center;"|
!width=15 style="background:#000000; color:white; text-align:center;"|
!width=226 style="background:#000000; color:white; text-align:center;"|Name
!width=130 style="background:#000000; color:white; text-align:center;"|Brasileirão Série A
!width=110 style="background:#000000; color:white; text-align:center;"|Copa do Brasil
!width=150 style="background:#000000; color:white; text-align:center;"|Rio de Janeiro State Championship
!width=80 style="background:#000000; color:white; text-align:center;"|Total
|-
|1
|
|MF
|
|Bernardo
|
|2
|7
|9
|-
|rowspan=2|2
|
|MF
|
|Jhon Cley
|1
|2
|2
|5
|-
|
|FW
|
|Nenê
|4
|1
|
|5
|-
|4
|
|DF
|
|Mádson
|2
|
|2
|4
|-
|rowspan=2|5
|
|MF
|
|Andrezinho
|3
|
|
|3
|-
|
|FW
|
|Gilberto
|1
|
|2
|3
|-
|rowspan=2|7
|
|MF
|
|Santiago Montoya
|
|
|2
|2
|-
|
|MF
|
|Serginho
|2
|
|
|2
|-
|rowspan=11|7
|
|DF
|
|Aislan
|
|1
|
|1
|-
|
|DF
|
|Anderson Salles
|
|
|1
|1
|-
|
|DF
|
|Christianno
|
|
|1
|1
|-
|
|MF
|
|Julio dos Santos
|
|
|1
|1
|-
|
|MF
|
|Pablo Guiñazú
|
|
|1
|1
|-
|
|MF
|
|Jean Patrick
|
|
|1
|1
|-
|
|MF
|
|Lucas
|
|
|1
|1
|-
|
|FW
|
|Dagoberto
|1
|
|
|1
|-
|
|FW
|
|Jorge Henrique
|1
|
|
|1
|-
|
|FW
|
|Rafael Silva
|1
|
|
|1
|-
|
|FW
|
|Duvier Riascos
|
|1
|
|1
|-
|colspan="4"|
! style="background:#000000; color:white; text-align:center;"|TOTALS
! style="background:#000000; color:white; text-align:center;"|16
! style="background:#000000; color:white; text-align:center;"|6
! style="background:#000000; color:white; text-align:center;"|21
! style="background:#000000; color:white; text-align:center;"|44

Those in italics are no longer with club.

Clean sheets 
{| class="wikitable" style="font-size: 95%; text-align: center;"
|-
!width=15 style="background:#000000; color:white; text-align:center;"|
!width=15 style="background:#000000; color:white; text-align:center;"|
!width=15 style="background:#000000; color:white; text-align:center;"|
!width=15 style="background:#000000; color:white; text-align:center;"|
!width=226 style="background:#000000; color:white; text-align:center;"|Name
!width=130 style="background:#000000; color:white; text-align:center;"|Brasileirão Série A
!width=110 style="background:#000000; color:white; text-align:center;"|Copa do Brasil
!width=150 style="background:#000000; color:white; text-align:center;"|Rio de Janeiro State Championship
!width=80 style="background:#000000; color:white; text-align:center;"|Total
|-
|1
|
|GK
|
|Martín Silva
|8
|2
|10
|20
|-
|2
|
|GK
|
|Charles
|2
|
|
|2
|-
|3
|
|GK
|
|Jordi
|1
|
|
|1
|-
|rowspan=3|4
|
|GK
|
|Alessandro
|
|
|
|
|-
|
|GK
|
|Diogo Silva
|
|
|
|
|-
|
|GK
|
|Rafael Copetti
|
|
|
|
|-
|colspan="4"|
! style="background:#000000; color:white; text-align:center;"|TOTALS
! style="background:#000000; color:white; text-align:center;"|11
! style="background:#000000; color:white; text-align:center;"|2
! style="background:#000000; color:white; text-align:center;"|10
! style="background:#000000; color:white; text-align:center;"|23

Those in italics are no longer with club.

Disciplinary record 
{| class="wikitable" style="font-size: 95%; text-align: center;"
|-
| rowspan="2"  style="width:2.5%;background:#000000; text-align:center; color:white;"|
| rowspan="2"  style="width:3%;background:#000000; text-align:center; color:white;"|
| rowspan="2"  style="width:3%;background:#000000; text-align:center; color:white;"|
| rowspan="2"  style="width:3%;background:#000000; text-align:center; color:white;"|
| rowspan="2"  style="width:15%;background:#000000; text-align:center; color:white;"|Name
| colspan="3" style="text-align:center;background:#000000; color:white;"|Brasileirão Série A
| colspan="3" style="text-align:center;background:#000000; color:white;"|Copa do Brasil
| colspan="3" style="text-align:center;background:#000000; color:white;"|Rio de Janeiro State Championship
| colspan="3" style="text-align:center;background:#000000; color:white;"|Total
|-
!  style="width:25px; background:#fe9;"|
!  style="width:28px; background:#ff8888;"|
!  style="width:25px; background:#ff8888;"|
!  style="width:25px; background:#fe9;"|
!  style="width:28px; background:#ff8888;"|
!  style="width:25px; background:#ff8888;"|
!  style="width:25px; background:#fe9;"|
!  style="width:28px; background:#ff8888;"|
!  style="width:25px; background:#ff8888;"|
!  style="width:25px; background:#fe9;"|
!  style="width:28px; background:#ff8888;"|
!  style="width:25px; background:#ff8888;"|
|-
|1
|
|DF
|
|Rodrigo
|8
|2
|0
|2
|0
|0
|6
|0
|0
|16
|2
|0
|-
|rowspan=2|2
|
|MF
|
|Pablo Guiñazú
|7
|1
|0
|
|
|
|7
|0
|1
|14
|1
|1
|-
|
|MF
|
|Serginho
|10
|0
|0
|2
|0
|0
|6
|0
|0
|18
|0
|0
|-
|4
|
|FW
|
|Rafael Silva
|4
|1
|2
|3
|0
|0
|2
|0
|0
|9
|1
|2
|-
|5
|
|DF
|
|Christianno
|4
|0
|1
|1
|0
|0
|7
|0
|0
|12
|0
|1
|-
|6
|
|DF
|
|Luan
|9
|0
|0
|
|
|
|3
|0
|0
|12
|0
|0
|-
|7
|
|FW
|
|Dagoberto
|6
|0
|0
|1
|1
|0
|2
|0
|0
|9
|1
|0
|-
|8
|
|FW
|
|Gilberto
|2
|1
|0
|
|
|
|6
|0
|0
|8
|1
|0
|-
|9
|
|MF
|
|Julio dos Santos
|2
|1
|0
|1
|0
|0
|4
|0
|0
|7
|1
|0
|-
|rowspan=4|10
|
|GK
|
|Martín Silva
|4
|0
|0
|2
|0
|0
|1
|0
|0
|7
|0
|0
|-
|
|DF
|
|Mádson
|6
|0
|0
|
|
|
|1
|0
|0
|7
|0
|0
|-
|
|FW
|
|Jorge Henrique
|1
|0
|3
|
|
|
|
|
|
|1
|0
|3
|-
|
|FW
|
|Duvier Riascos
|5
|0
|0
|2
|0
|0
|
|
|
|7
|0
|0
|-
|rowspan=2|14
|
|MF
|
|Jhon Cley
|3
|1
|0
|
|
|
|1
|0
|0
|4
|1
|0
|-
|
|MF
|
|Lucas
|4
|0
|0
|1
|0
|0
|1
|0
|0
|6
|0
|0
|-
|rowspan=2|16
|
|DF
|
|Anderson Salles
|3
|0
|0
|2
|0
|0
|
|
|
|5
|0
|0
|-
|
|MF
|
|Bernardo
|
|
|
|1
|0
|0
|0
|0
|2
|1
|0
|2
|-
|rowspan=4|18
|
|MF
|
|Bruno Gallo
|4
|0
|0
|
|
|
|
|
|
|4
|0
|0
|-
|
|MF
|
|Santiago Montoya
|
|
|
|
|
|
|2
|1
|0
|2
|1
|0
|-
|
|FW
|
|Germán Herrera
|4
|0
|0
|
|
|
|
|
|
|4
|0
|0
|-
|
|FW
|
|Thalles
|1
|0
|0
|1
|0
|0
|2
|0
|0
|4
|0
|0
|-
|rowspan=5|22
|
|GK
|
|Jordi
|1
|0
|1
|
|
|
|
|
|
|1
|0
|1
|-
|
|MF
|
|Andrezinho
|3
|0
|0
|
|
|
|
|
|
|3
|0
|0
|-
|
|MF
|
|Marcinho
|
|
|
|1
|0
|0
|2
|0
|0
|3
|0
|0
|-
|
|FW
|
|Nenê
|2
|0
|0
|1
|0
|0
|
|
|
|3
|0
|0
|-
|
|FW
|
|Yago
|2
|0
|0
|
|
|
|1
|0
|0
|3
|0
|0
|-
|rowspan=5|27
|
|DF
|
|Lorran
|
|
|
|
|
|
|2
|0
|0
|2
|0
|0
|-
|
|DF
|
|Nei
|
|
|
|1
|0
|0
|1
|0
|0
|2
|0
|0
|-
|
|DF
|
|Rafael Vaz
|2
|0
|0
|
|
|
|
|
|
|2
|0
|0
|-
|
|MF
|
|Emanuel Biancucchi
|2
|0
|0
|
|
|
|
|
|
|2
|0
|0
|-
|
|MF
|
|Diguinho
|2
|0
|0
|
|
|
|
|
|
|2
|0
|0
|-
|rowspan=7|32
|
|GK
|
|Charles
|1
|0
|0
|
|
|
|
|
|
|1
|0
|0
|-
|
|DF
|
|Aislan
|
|
|
|1
|0
|0
|
|
|
|1
|0
|0
|-
|
|DF
|
|Júlio César
|1
|0
|0
|
|
|
|
|
|
|1
|0
|0
|-
|
|MF
|
|Victor Bolt
|
|
|
|1
|0
|0
|
|
|
|1
|0
|0
|-
|
|FW
|
|Éder Luís
|1
|0
|0
|
|
|
|
|
|
|1
|0
|0
|-
|
|FW
|
|Leandrão
|1
|0
|0
|
|
|
|
|
|
|1
|0
|0
|-
|
|FW
|
|Romarinho
|1
|0
|0
|
|
|
|
|
|
|1
|0
|0
|-
|colspan="4"|
! style="background:#000000; color:white; text-align:center;"|TOTALS
! style="background:#000000; color:white; text-align:center;"|107
! style="background:#000000; color:white; text-align:center;"|7
! style="background:#000000; color:white; text-align:center;"|7
! style="background:#000000; color:white; text-align:center;"|24
! style="background:#000000; color:white; text-align:center;"|1
! style="background:#000000; color:white; text-align:center;"|0
! style="background:#000000; color:white; text-align:center;"|57
! style="background:#000000; color:white; text-align:center;"|1
! style="background:#000000; color:white; text-align:center;"|3
! style="background:#000000; color:white; text-align:center;"|188
! style="background:#000000; color:white; text-align:center;"|9
! style="background:#000000; color:white; text-align:center;"|10

Those in italics are no longer with the club.

Captains 
Last updated on 6 December 2015.

Team statistics

Starting eleven 
All competitions.

International call-ups

Honors

Individual

See also 

 2015 Rio de Janeiro State Championship
 2015 Copa do Brasil
 2015 Brasileirão Série A

Notes

References 

CR Vasco da Gama
Club de Regatas Vasco da Gama seasons
Vasco da Gama